The Bukachacha Formation is a geological formation in Zabaykalsky Krai, Russia dating to the Early Cretaceous (Barremian). The tuffaceous mudstones of the formation were deposited in a lacustrine environment.

Fossil content 
The formation has provided fossil insects:

 Coleoptera
 Coptoclavidae
 Stygeonectes jurassicus
 Trichoptera
 Phryganeidae
 Proagrypnia sp.
 Ephemerida
 Hexagenitidae
 Ephemeropsis trisetalis

See also 
 List of fossiliferous stratigraphic units in Russia
 Batylykh Formation, contemporaneous fossiliferous formation of Buryatia

References

Bibliography 

 
 
 

Geologic formations of Russia
Lower Cretaceous Series of Asia
Cretaceous Russia
Barremian Stage
Mudstone formations
Tuff formations
Lacustrine deposits
Fossiliferous stratigraphic units of Asia
Paleontology in Russia
Formations